Pt. Reepu Daman Persaud (c. 1936, 6 April 2013) was a Guyanese politician and Hindu pandit from the People's Progressive Party/Civic. 

He was elected to the Parliament consecutively from 1964 to 2006. He served a member of cabinet between 1992 and 2001 as Minister of Agriculture and between 1997 and 2001 as Minister of Parliamentary Affairs as well. He was also twice appointed as the Second Vice President of Guyana - from March to December 1997, and from August 1999 to December 2011.

References

External links
Hindus of South America Hinduism Today - January 2000

1936 births
2013 deaths
Indo-Guyanese people
People's Progressive Party (Guyana) politicians
Vice presidents of Guyana
Guyanese Hindus
Government ministers of Guyana